People Reform Party () was a political party in Thailand.

In the 2019 general election, the party's stance was to support military junta head General Prayut Chan-o-cha to remain as prime minister. The party had the reform of the Buddhist clergy in Thailand as a central part of its platform. During the campaign, the party was investigated for using Buddhism for political advertisement but was cleared by the Thai Election Commission. According to preliminary results, party originally won no seats in Parliament with only 40,000 votes, but after the Thai Election Commission altered the formula in how seats were awarded after the election results were announced, the party gained one seat, with Paiboon becoming the only MP, and allowing the junta-backed Palang Pracharat party to form a coalition government and control the lower house of Parliament.

On 22 August 2019, Paiboon revealed that the party executive committee had unanimously voted to dissolve the party, as the party only had a single MP and most party executive directors did not have time to organize its branches.

On 26 August 2019, the Election Commission of Thailand approved the dissolution of the party, which was officially published in the Royal Thai Government Gazette on 6 September 2019. Paiboon announced that he had applied to become a member of Palang Pracharath Party on 9 September.

References

2018 establishments in Thailand
2019 disestablishments in Thailand
Conservative parties in Thailand
Defunct conservative parties
Defunct political parties in Thailand
Political parties disestablished in 2018
Political parties established in 2011
Populist parties